Swatte Fell is a hill in the Moffat Hills range, part of the Southern Uplands of Scotland. It lies north of the town of Moffat in Dumfries and Galloway, south of its parent peak, Hart Fell. It is gently sloping on three sides of the hill, however the east ridge is steep and craggy and features a deep corrie known as Blackhope, from which a popular rock climb, the Coomb Craig ridge, originates, finishing near the summit, and was featured on the OS Explorer 330 map front cover. The normal route is from the southern ridge and can be extended to include a full loop of Blackhope, finishing on Saddle Yoke, known as the Hart Fell Horseshoe.

Subsidiary SMC Summits

References

Donald mountains
Mountains and hills of Dumfries and Galloway
Mountains and hills of the Scottish Borders